Shah Abdur Rahim (1644-1719) was an Islamic scholar and a writer who assisted in the compilation of Fatawa-e-Alamgiri, the voluminous code of Islamic law. He was the father of the Muslim philosopher Shah Waliullah Dehlawi. He became a disciple of Khwaja Khurd son of Khawaja Baqi billah a  revered Sufi of Delhi.
He established Madrasa Rahimiyya in Delhi, a theological college which later played a part in the religious emancipation of Muslim India and became the breeding ground of religious reformers and mujahideen like Shah Waliullah and Shah Abdul Aziz.

Islamic services
Shah Abdur Rahim was a Sufi and an Hanafi scholar who wrote works of Islamic law. He taught at the Madrasa Rahimiyya, a theological college, or seminary, that he helped establish. The institution would become an important part of the religious emancipation of Muslim India, as it provided a starting point for later religious reformers.

Madrassa Rahimya
Madrassa Rahimya was an Islamic institute in Delhi with a developed curriculum and better teaching methodologies; in other words, it was well-established and organized. The translation of the Quran also took place in Madrassa Rahimya. After Shah Abdul Rahim, his son Shah Walliullah taught there and upgraded the curriculum. Future Islamic scholars and leaders like Syed Ahmed Shaheed Barelvi got their education from Madrassa Rahimya.

Works
He was a leading scholar of traditional sciences.
Some of his works include 
1) Fatawa-e-Alamgiri 
2) Irshad-e-Rahimiya, a book on the Naqshbandi Sufi path, 
3) Anfas-e-Rahimiya,  
4) some letters

References

Further reading
M. A. A. Thanvi. M.A.A.THANVI S STORIES OF SAINT. Adam Publishers & Distributors. pp. 13–. 

Hanafis
Maturidis
Indian Sufis
17th-century Muslim scholars of Islam
1644 births
1719 deaths
Burials at Mehdiyan